Inevitable End are a Swedish death metal band from Jönköping, who are signed to Relapse Records.

History
Inevitable End started out in 2003 as a group that was highly influenced by thrash metal and has evolved over time to be securely rooted in the death metal genre. The band released two demos, a self-titled album in 2004 and Reversal in 2006, each consisting of three songs clocking in around fifteen minutes each.  After a few years of playing thrash metal, the band moved from Jönköping to Gothenburg where they underwent some critical line-up changes. With a new solidified line-up consisting of Andres Gerden, Marcus Bertilsson, Johan Ylenstrand, and Joakim Malmborg, the Quartet spent most of 2007 in the rehearsal studio. After honing their new sound, the band signed to Relapse Records and started recording for their first full-length debut, The Severed Inception, which would be released March 17, 2009 in North America (March 23 internationally). Inevitable End has toured Norway, Finland, Czech Republic and Switzerland, as well as their home country of Sweden.

Personnel
Current members
 Marcus Bertilsson - guitar
 Johan Ylenstrand - bass (Crimson Moonlight, ex-Miseration)
 Savage - drums
 Christoffer Jonsson - vocals

Former members
 Andres Gerden - vocals
 Joakim Malmborg - drums (ex-Crimson Moonlight)
 Emil Westerdahl - bass
 Joakim Bergquist - vocals/bass
 Magnus Semerson - vocals
 Jonas Arvidson - guitar
 Christoffer Johansson - drums (ex-Shadows of Paragon)

Discography
 Inevitable End (demo, 2004)
 Reversal (demo, 2006)
 The Severed Inception (Relapse, 2009)
 The Oculus (2011)

References

External links
 Official Inevitable End website
 Official Inevitable End Myspace
 Inevitable End biography @ MusicMight

Musical groups established in 2003
Swedish death metal musical groups